"Night Train" is the sixth single by the British pop group Visage, released by Polydor Records in June 1982.

Background
The song was the second single from the band's album The Anvil. It was remixed for the single release with the assistance of John Luongo, and also available as a limited edition picture disc.

The B-side of the single is a non-album track, "I'm Still Searching". This song was not available on any digital format until 2008 when a re-issue of The Anvil was released by Cherry Red Records.

"Night Train" and "Whispers" (another track from The Anvil), were used in Japanese adverts for TDK tapes in 1982. "Night Train" peaked at number 12 in the UK and was the band's final UK Top 40 hit until a remix of their first hit "Fade to Grey" was released in 1993.

The "Night Train" promo video was directed by Jean-Claude Luyat and it features Francesca von Habsburg (who was Steve Strange's girlfriend at the time, as a backing vocalist, although she didn't perform on the actual record) and french actress Eva Ionesco.

Track listing
 7" single (1982)
A. "Night Train" – 3:39
B. "I'm Still Searching" – 3:37

 12" single (1982)
A. "Night Train" (Dance Mix) – 6:07
B1. "Night Train" (Dub Mix) – 5:02
B2. "I'm Still Searching" – 3:38

Personnel
Steve Strange — vocals
Midge Ure — synthesizer
Billy Currie — synthesizer
Rusty Egan — drums
Dave Formula — synthesizer
Barry Adamson — bass
Gary Barnacle — saxophone
Perri Lister — backing vocals
Lorraine Whitmarsh— backing vocals

Chart performance

References

1982 singles
Songs about trains
Songs written by Midge Ure
Visage (band) songs
Songs written by Billy Currie
Songs written by Steve Strange
Songs written by Rusty Egan
Songs written by Dave Formula
1981 songs
Polydor Records singles